Cantharis rufa is a species of soldier beetles native to Europe.

References

Cantharidae
Beetles described in 1758
Beetles of Europe
Taxa named by Carl Linnaeus